The Glebe House is an 18th-century Georgian brick building in Poughkeepsie, Dutchess County, New York, USA. It is listed in the National Register of Historic Places as a historic place of local significance since 1982.

The name "Glebe House" refers to the glebe, an area of land the proceeds of which supported the parish and its minister. The land associated with Glebe House was about 1 square kilometre (250 acres) in size.

The Glebe House itself was constructed in 1767 as a Georgian red brick building on a rubble stone foundation. It was to serve rectory for the Reverend John Beardsley, who ministered at Christ Church, Poughkeepsie and Trinity Church in Fishkill and his family in 1767. Since Beardsley was a Loyalist, he and his entire household were forced to flee to New York City in December 1777 to seek the protection of the British during the American Revolutionary War.

After 1777, the house and the land passed through many hands. During this time, it housed a public beer garden and later a florist
business. In the early 19th century, an addition to the building was made by Peter De Reimer.

In 1929, the house and the remainder of the glebe land (now less than 1 acre) were purchased by members of the Dutchess County Historical Society and the Junior League to protect it from demolition. The house was given to the City of Poughkeepsie to be operated jointly by the Dutchess County Historical Society and the Junior League.

The Dutchess County Historical Society was involved with the house from 1929 to 2016. Now home to Fall Kill Creative Works.

See also

National Register of Historic Places listings in Poughkeepsie, New York

References

External links
Dutchess County Historical Society

Houses on the National Register of Historic Places in New York (state)
National Register of Historic Places in Poughkeepsie, New York
Houses in Poughkeepsie, New York
Museums in Dutchess County, New York
Georgian architecture in New York (state)
Houses completed in 1767
Historic house museums in New York (state)
Historical society museums in New York (state)
Tourist attractions in Poughkeepsie, New York
1767 establishments in the Province of New York